IFCC-KSK (Indonesian Forestry Certification Cooperation, or in Indonesian, Kerjasama Sertifikasi Kehutanan) is the standardising and governing body for the Indonesian Forest Certification Scheme. It promotes sustainable forest management through forest certification and labeling of forest-based products that originate from certified forests. IFCC-KSK develops standards and requirements for forest certification in consensus-based, multi-stakeholder processes.

Profile 

In Indonesia adoption of sustainable forest management (SFM) is a mandatory obligation for forest operators, as stipulated by the Law of the Republic of Indonesia No.41/1999 on Forestry. An effective implementation of SFM will help ensure that the country's forest resources continue to provide ecological, economic, social, and cultural services in an optimal, balanced, and sustainable way.

In order to foster adoption of SFM, one among many tools that can be used is forestry certification because it allows forestry stakeholders to assess progresses in achieving SFM. As a tool, forestry certification scheme needs to be developed based on a set of criteria and indicators, which are in accordance to local, national and global requirements. The scheme also needs to be developed in a spirit of cooperation, not negative campaigns and other various forms of coercion and unfair pressures from one party to another. This is the spirit behind the establishment of the Indonesian Forestry Certification Cooperation-Kerjasama Sertifikasi Kehutanan (IFCC-KSK).

Aims and objectives
IFCC-KSK was established on October 19, 2011. Its objectives is to promote SFM by implementation of the Programme for the Endorsement of Forest Certification (PEFC) Scheme, which includes among others, but not limited to, certification of forest management, forest products, forest product-processing industries and the chain of custody.

To achieve its objectives IFCC-KSK will coordinate and develop a credible PEFC-based forestry certification scheme in Indonesia, and establish a mutually beneficial cooperation between business community and the general public (civil society) in achieving SFM.

Scope of activities
IFCC-KSK intends to join PEFC as a full member and to become PEFC's National Governing Body in Indonesia.

Scope of IFCC-KSK's activities includes, among others, the following:
 To promote and strengthen cooperation between the business and civil societies in attempts to achieve SFM,
 To faster a closer, mutually respectful and more productive relation among all forestry stakeholders at the national and global levels,
 To work together with government institutions, including Ministry of Forestry, the National Standardization Agency and the National Accreditation Committee, in forestry certification.
 To carry out training for auditors and undertake competency tests.

Organization structure
The IFCC-KSK structure consists of the general meeting of members, the governing body, and the board of supervisors. The governing board as the body that manages the whole management of IFCC-KSK, currently consists of a chairman (Ir. H. Dradjad H. Wibowo), a general secretary (Saniah) and a treasurer (Dewi Suryati).

Board of supervisors establish a secretariat to carry out daily activities of the IFCC-KSK led by one executive director (Zulfandi Lubis), one program manager who oversees the program staff, a training manager who oversees the training of staffs, one public relations manager who oversees the staff communication/ public relations, a financial manager who is in charge of an administration and financial staffs.

External links
  
  

Forestry in Indonesia
Forestry agencies
Forest certification